LW Stores, Inc. was a retailer that liquidated consumer merchandise through 94 outlets across Canada and three in the United States. The retailer also provided store-closure sales management and solved asset recovery problems in a professional manner for the financial services industry, insurance companies, manufacturers and other organizations. LW Stores, Inc. was known as Liquidation World, Inc. until 2010. The chain had stores in the Canadian provinces of Alberta, British Columbia, Saskatchewan, Manitoba, Ontario, New Brunswick and Nova Scotia. It was a subsidiary of Big Lots from 2011 until its closing in 2014.

History
 
LW Stores was founded as Liquidation World in 1986 with the opening of its first store, at 3900 29 St NE, in northeast Calgary, Alberta, Canada. The chain had grown to be the largest liquidator in Canada, with more than 1,200 employees in outlets and offices across Canada. The company began operating stores in the United States in the early 1990s. Most U.S. stores were opened in sold-to bankrupt retailers, most notably Ernst Home Centers, in which several former Ernst stores were acquired by the chain in the late 1990s. By 2007, the company had shuttered all but three of its U.S. stores due to declining sales. The final American store, located in Spokane, Washington, was closed in April 2010 after fifteen years in business.

In December 2013, Big Lots announced it was closing all LW and Big Lots stores in Canada to focus on its American division. By February 2014, all Canadian Big Lots and LW Stores were closed.

See also 
List of Canadian department stores

References 

Furniture retailers of Canada
Discount stores of Canada
Companies based in Ontario
Brantford
Defunct retail companies of Canada
Retail companies established in 1986
Companies disestablished in 2014
1986 establishments in Ontario
2014 disestablishments in Ontario
Defunct retail companies of the United States